Leslie Kelly may refer to:

 Leslie Kelley (born 1944), American football player
 Leslie George Kelly (1906–1959), New Zealand journalist, engine driver and historian